The 14th International 500-Mile Sweepstakes Race was held at the Indianapolis Motor Speedway on Monday, May 31, 1926. Louis Chevrolet drove the Chrysler pace car for the start.

Rain halted the race at lap 72, and officials waited for the track to dry out. The race was resumed over an hour later. Rain fell again, and the race was called at the 400 mile mark (160 laps). 

Rookie Frank Lockhart moved up from 20th to fifth by lap 5, having had passed 14 cars on that lap alone. He moved up to second on Lap 16. After the rain delay, Lockhart and Dave Lewis battled for the lead for about 20 laps, until Lewis dropped out.  After Lewis retired with a broken valve, Harry Hartz closed on Lockhart and briefly took the lead at about 250 miles as the crowd roared. But soon afterward Hartz was forced to make an unscheduled pit stop.  Lockhart then stretched out a two-lap lead when the race was called, and he was declared the winner. It was the first rain-shortened race in "500" history, and Lockhart was the fourth rookie to win the race. Lockhart may have actually completed as many as 163 laps (407.5 miles), but official scoring results reverted to the completion of lap 160.

Time trials
Four-lap (10 mile) qualifying runs were utilized. Earl Cooper won the pole position. Frank Lockhart set a new 1-lap track record during his first attempt at 115.488 mph, but the run was aborted after a tire failure on the second lap. He later blew an engine during another attempt, and finally put a car in the field 20th on the grid.

Results

Race details
For 1926, riding mechanics were optional, however, no teams utilized them.
First alternate: none
This would be the first Indy 500 where a driver from the inaugural Indy 500 did not compete.

References

Indianapolis 500 races
Indianapolis 500
Indianapolis 500
1926 in American motorsport
May 1926 sports events